In probability theory, two sequences of probability measures are said to be contiguous if asymptotically they share the same support. Thus the notion of contiguity extends the concept of absolute continuity to the sequences of measures.

He is best known for the general concepts of local asymptotic normality and contiguity.

Definition
Let  be a sequence of measurable spaces, each equipped with two measures Pn and Qn. 
 We say that Qn is contiguous with respect to Pn (denoted ) if for every sequence An of measurable sets,  implies .
 The sequences Pn and Qn are said to be mutually contiguous or bi-contiguous (denoted ) if both Qn is contiguous with respect to Pn and Pn is contiguous with respect to Qn.

The notion of contiguity is closely related to that of absolute continuity. We say that a measure Q is absolutely continuous with respect to P (denoted ) if for any measurable set A,  implies . That is, Q is absolutely continuous with respect to P if the support of Q is a subset of the support of P, except in cases where this is false, including, e.g., a measure that concentrates on an open set, because its support is a closed set and it assigns measure zero to the boundary, and so another measure may concentrate on the boundary and thus have support contained within the support of the first measure, but they will be mutually singular. In summary, this previous sentence's statement of absolute continuity is false. The contiguity property replaces this requirement with an asymptotic one: Qn is contiguous with respect to Pn if the "limiting support" of Qn is a subset of the limiting support of Pn. By the aforementioned logic, this statement is also false.

It is possible however that each of the measures Qn be absolutely continuous with respect to Pn, while the sequence Qn not being contiguous with respect to Pn.

 
which is interpreted as being able to "reconstruct" the measure Q from knowing the measure P and the derivative ƒ. A similar result exists for contiguous sequences of measures, and is given by the Le Cam's third lemma.

Properties 
 For the case  for all n it applies .
 It is possible that  is true for all n without .

Le Cam's first lemma 
For two sequences of measures  on measurable spaces  the following statements are equivalent:
 
 
 
  for any statistics .

Applications
Econometrics

See also
Asymptotic theory (statistics)
Contiguity (disambiguation)
Probability space

Notes

References

Additional literature
Roussas, George G. (1972), Contiguity of Probability Measures: Some Applications in Statistics, CUP, .
Scott, D.J. (1982) Contiguity of Probability Measures, Australian & New Zealand Journal of Statistics, 24 (1), 80–88.

External links
Contiguity Asymptopia: 17 October 2000, David Pollard
Asymptotic normality under contiguity in a dependence case 
A Central Limit Theorem under Contiguous Alternatives
Superefficiency, Contiguity, LAN, Regularity, Convolution Theorems
Testing statistical hypotheses
Necessary and sufficient conditions for contiguity and entire asymptotic separation of probability measures R Sh Liptser et al 1982 Russ. Math. Surv. 37 107–136
The unconscious as infinite sets By Ignacio Matte Blanco, Eric (FRW) Rayner
"Contiguity of Probability Measures", David J. Scott, La Trobe University
"On the Concept of Contiguity", Hall, Loynes

Probability theory